This is the discography for American hip hop musician Jayo Felony.

Albums

Studio albums

Collaboration albums
Criminal Activity with Criminalz (2001)
Criminal Intent with Spice 1 (2007)

Singles

As lead artist

As featured artist

Promotional singles

Guest appearances

References 

Discographies of American artists
Hip hop discographies